Tarago Reservoir is a  reservoir located on the Tarago River near Neerim South, approximately  east of Melbourne, Victoria, Australia.

The reservoir was built in 1969 to supply water to towns near Neerim South, the Mornington Peninsula and Westernport regions. In 1994, Melbourne Water stopped using water from the reservoir as it had become unsuitable for drinking. Although it continued to be used for local water supplies, the reservoir was only reconnected to the metropolitan water supply system in 2009 following the construction of a water treatment plant.

References

Reservoirs in Victoria (Australia)
Dams in Victoria (Australia)
Melbourne Water catchment
Rivers of Gippsland (region)
Dams completed in 1969
Embankment dams
1969 establishments in Australia